La Vida de un Genio (English: The Life of a Genius) is the third studio album by Mexican-American cumbia group A.B. Quintanilla y Los Kumbia All Starz and the seventh studio album by Mexican-American musician A.B. Quintanilla. It was released on July 27, 2010 by EMI Latin and Capitol Latin. A digital deluxe edition containing interviews by A.B. Quintanilla about the songs and two versions of "Hipnótika" was also released on the same day on online music stores. A bonus song called "I'll Be There for You" is only included on the iTunes digital deluxe edition.

Background
On August 26, 2009, A.B. Quintanilla y Los Kumbia All Starz debuted a new song called "Chica Fatal" on the program Don Francisco Presenta, transmitted by Univision, sung by A.B. Quintanilla and DJ Kane. They later performed the song again on Premios Oye! 2009 on November 24, 2009, this time sung by Ricky Rick and DJ Kane. It was thought to be the new single until A.B. Quintanilla confirmed it wasn't the new single and it would not be on the album, instead another song will be chosen for to be the new single. In March 2010, the music video was recorded for the new single in Los Angeles, California. On March 16, 2010, the MySpace profile for Kumbia All Starz was updated for the first time since November 11, 2008, confirming the new single will be "Hipnótika" featuring Voltio and Marciano Cantero from Los Enanitos Verdes, which was released on April 13, 2010. The album's name was revealed to be La Vida de un Genio and was set to be released on May 18, 2010, then changed on June 29, 2010, but then changed to be released on July 27, 2010. A.B. Quintanilla has been working on the album since September 2009. The album was recorded in 43 days between January 8, 2010 and March 22, 2010. The album's title, La Vida de un Genio (The Life of a Genius) is a tribute A.B. Quintanilla's father, Abraham Quintanilla, Jr., who steered his career as well as that of his late sister Selena. Similar in concept to Santana's Supernatural, the songs were either written or co-written by A.B. Quintanilla with featured vocals by various artists. Appearances on the album include Voltio, Marciano Cantero from Los Enanitos Verdes, Yeyo from The D.E.Y., T López, Shaila Dúrcal, Gilberto Santa Rosa, Luis Enrique, Andrés Castro, Jorge Celedón, Jimmy Zambrano, Ana Isabelle, Ender Thomas, La Shica, Albita, Alex Lora from El Tri, José Feliciano, Jon Secada, Reyli Barba, Colby O'Donis, Joey Montana and Los Dinos. This is the first studio album in seven years to include lead singer DJ Kane on a studio album by A.B. Quintanilla since the album 4 released in 2003. This is the first time Los Dinos have recorded a song together on an album in over 15 years since the death of Selena.

Track listing

Notes
 All tracks produced by A.B. Quintanilla III and Luigi Giraldo, except track 2, produced by A.B. Quintanilla III, Abraham Quintanilla, Jr., Suzette Quintanilla, and Luigi Giraldo

Personnel

Kumbia All Starz
 A.B. Quintanilla III – bass guitar, backing vocals, composer, producer
 DJ Kane – vocals (provided lead vocals for tracks 1, 3, 4, 5, 7, 9 and bonus track 23)
 Ricky Rick – vocals (chorus)
 J.R. Lee Gomez, Jr. – vocals (chorus)
 Chris Pérez – guitar
 Nick Banda – keyboards
 Joey Jiménez – drums
 Robert "BoBBo" Gomez III – keyboards
 Noe "Gipper" / "El Animal" Nieto, Jr. – accordion
 Luigi Giraldo – piano, keyboards, composer, producer

Additional musicians
 Reyli Barba – vocals (track 3)
 Marciano Cantero – vocals (track 1)
 Andrés Castro – guitar (track 3)
 Jorge Celedón – vocals (track 9)
 Los Dinos – vocals, instruments (track 2)
 A.B. Quintanilla III – bass guitar (track 2)
 Suzette Quintanilla – drums (track 2)
 Chris Pérez – guitar (track 2)
 Pete Astudillo – vocals (track 2)
 Joe Ojeda – keyboards (track 2)
 Shaila Dúrcal – vocals (track 5)
 Luis Enrique – vocals (track 4)
 José Feliciano – vocals, guitar (track 2)
 Ana Isabelle – vocals (track 8)
 T López – vocals (track 7)
 Álex Lora – vocals, guitar (track 9)
 Joey Montana – vocals (bonus track 23)
 Colby O'Donis – vocals (bonus track 23)
 Abraham Quintanilla, Jr. – producer (track 2)
 Suzette Quintanilla – producer (track 2)
 Antonio "Rayito" Rayo – guitar (track 8)
 Albita Rodríguez – vocals (track 8)
 Gilberto Santa Rosa – vocals (track 6)
 Jon Secada – vocals (track 10)
 La Shica – vocals (track 8)
 Ender Thomas – vocals (track 8)
 Julio Voltio – vocals (track 1)
 Yeyo – vocals (track 7)
 Jimmy Zambrano – accordion (track 9)

Charts

References

2010 albums
Kumbia All Starz albums
A. B. Quintanilla albums
Albums produced by A.B. Quintanilla
Capitol Latin albums
Spanish-language albums
Cumbia albums
Albums recorded at Q-Productions